Lewes Priory is a cricket club based in Lewes, England. The club is based at the Stanley Turner Ground, Kingston road, Lewes. The Saturday 1st XI plays in the 2nd division of the Sussex Cricket League. The Saturday 2nd XI plays in the 2nd XI Division 2 of the Sussex Cricket League. The Saturday 3rd XI plays in Division 9 of the East Sussex Cricket League. There is also a Sunday XI and an occasional midweek XI that play friendly matches.

Lewes Priory has a large junior section and was clubmark accredited until October 2014. The club runs sides from under-8s/9s to an under-16 development XI
Quite a few of the Lewes Priory junior players play area cricket, eastern eagles, southern sabres etc. The current under 16 team features a player who plays for sussex academy.

Lewes Priory is associated with the annual wandering side Lewes Nomads. In the summer of 2013 and 2014 their tour is to the Isle of Wight.

Some matches are held at Falmer.  Lewes (and the locations of the home games of Lewes Priory Cricket Club) are six minutes by train/bus from the University of Sussex.

Honours
Sussex Cricket League
Premier Division champions 1986, 1990
Division 2 champions 1999, 2006, 2008

History
The origin of the club extends back to at least 1831 when Mr J. Longford (one of the local brewers) bought 10 acres of the Lewes Priory Grounds from the Earl of Chichester and made some of the grounds known as the 'Dripping Pan' available for cricket

Timeline of club history

Club captains
1960 H. Pett
1961 J. Winter
1962 J. Winter
1963 R. C. Cosham
1964 R. C. Cosham
1965 R. C. Cosham
1966 J. O'Connor
1967 J. O'Connor
1968 J. O'Connor
1969 R. C. Cosham
1970 S. B. Hughes
1972 S. B. Hughes
1973 C. H. Johnson
1974 C. H. Johnson
1975 J. O'Connor
1976 J. O'Connor
1977 J. O'Connor
1978 J. O'Connor
1979 J. O'Connor
1980 J. Leckey
1981 B. Holding
1982 B. Holding
1983 B. Holding
1984 R. Seager
1985 R. Seager
1986 R. Seager
1987 R. Seager
1988 C. Hartridge
1989 C. Hartridge
1990 J. Roycroft
1991 J. Roycroft
2000 K. Ibrahim
2001 K. Ibrahim
2002 M. Murray
2003 M. Murray
2004 M. Murray
2005 M. Murray 
2006 M. Murray
2007 M. Murray
2008 M. Murray
2009 M. Murray
2010 C. Baker
2011 M. Murray
2012 T. Sharp
2013 R. Eborn
2014 J. Bates
2015 unknown
2016 I. Khan
2017 I. Khan
2018 I. Khan

Club Presidents
To 1981 Rt Hon. Viscount Gage KCVO
1982-1985 S. B. Hughes, Esq
1986-1984 J. P. Beilby, Esq
1995-1996 R. J. Hayward
1996-1999 R. C. Cosham
2000 to date J. A. O'Connor

Notable members
Herbert Whitfield 
Henry Holroyd, 3rd Earl of Sheffield 
Freeman Freeman-Thomas, 1st Marquess of Willingdon 
Alfred Mynn
George Spillman represented Middlesex CCC.  Died c1911
 George Kent (1907-1980):  Captain of Lewes Priory Cricket Club and Lewes Rugby Football Club.  Kent served as president of the Sussex County Rugby Football Club, was a committee member of the Sussex County Cricket Club, chairman of the Lewes Building Society and the Sussex County Building Society. He was Conservative district counsellor for Kingston in 1973 and served as chairman of Lewes District Council
 Brian Lessiter played cricket for Cornwall and Sussex second eleven.
 Jon Roycroft director of sport at Oxford University
 Bob Gardner played for Leicestershire. Play for Lewes Priory CC for two seasons as opening batsman (his batting average in one year was 54; the next 61)
  Les Bampton a leg spin and googly bowler who captained the Club Cricket Conference for several years. Took 300 wickets twice in a season

Sussex CCC players
Since 1938 at least six Lewes Priory players have played for Sussex, including:
  Doug Smith fast bowler who played for sussex before the second world war
  D.J. Smith 
  P.G. Laker 
  Ralph Cowen:  Oxford blue at cricket and football who was at the receiving end of the fastest goal (at that time) scored at Wembley.  He also took 6 wickets for 19 runs bowling Sussex to victory against the Aussies.  One of his victim was Alan Border
  Carl Hopkinson  current fielding coach at Sussex CCC
  Paul Phillipson

England players
  Rosalie Birch

Overseas players and members
  K.G.N. (Kyron) Lynch (Trinidad & Tobago) 
  Amit Jaggernauth (Trinidad & Tobago offspinner) 
  Rayad Emrit (Trinidad & Tobago off) 
  Suren Perera (Sri Lanka and Ragama cricket club) 
  Kashif Ibrahim 
  Indrajit Coomaraswamy
  John Boyd played top grade cricket for Waverley cricket club in Sydney, Australia

References

External links
Official website:  Lewes Priory CC

Cricket in East Sussex
English club cricket teams